"Livin' with a Heartache" is a song written by Carl Wilson and Randy Bachman for the American rock band the Beach Boys, one of two collaborations between the two writers. It was recorded from August 27–29 at Bachman's home studio known as "The Barn" in Lynden, Washington with two further sessions at Rumbo Studios in November and December 1979. "Livin' with a Heartache" was released on the Beach Boys' 1980 album Keepin' the Summer Alive and was subsequently released with a truncated 3:05 mix as a single backed with "Santa Ana Winds" which failed to chart in the US.

Record World called it a "gem" and said that the "melody & hook are perfect."

Performers
Adapted from 2000 liner notes and Craig Slowinski.

Livin’ with a Heartache

The Beach Boys
Carl Wilson – lead vocals, guitar, Yamaha electric piano, uncredited producer
Bruce Johnston – harmony and backing vocals, producer

Additional musicians and production staff
Terry Melcher, Curt Boettcher, Jon Joyce – harmony and backing vocals
Billy Joe Walker, Jr. – lead and acoustic guitars
Bryan Garofalo – bass
John Hobbs – tack piano
Gary Mallaber – drums
Steve Forman – percussion
Steve Desper – engineer, mixing

Santa Ana Winds
The Beach Boys
Brian Wilson – harmony and backing vocals, producer
Carl Wilson – harmony and backing vocals, additional lead vocals
Al Jardine – lead vocals, harmony and backing vocals, acoustic guitars, spoken word introduction, producer
Mike Love – harmony and backing vocals, additional lead vocals
Bruce Johnston – harmony and backing vocals, producer

Additional musicians
Lyle Ritz – double bass
Steve Forman – brushed snare drum and timpani
Tommy Morgan – harmonica
Igor Horoshevsky, Raymond Kelley – cellos
James Getzoff, Murray Adler, Bonnie Douglas, Paul Shure, Alfred Breuning, Marshall Sosson, Endre Granat, Spiro Stamos – violins
Harry Hyams, Samuel Boghossian – violas
Harry Betts – string arrangements
Steve Desper – chief engineer, mixing
Chuck Leary – engineer
Chuck Britz – engineer

References

External links
 "Livin' With a Heartache" review at Allmusic

1980 singles
The Beach Boys songs
Songs written by Carl Wilson
Songs written by Randy Bachman
Song recordings produced by Bruce Johnston
1980 songs